Fungurume is a town in Lualaba province, in southeast Democratic Republic of the Congo. In 2012, it had a population of 34,104, up from 28,938 in 2008.

The city is located about 200 kilometers from Lubumbashi. Its economy is mostly based around copper and cobalt mines.

References

Populated places in Lualaba Province